Alexander "Sandy" Moger (born March 21, 1969) is a Canadian former ice hockey player who played in the National Hockey League for the Boston Bruins and the Los Angeles Kings. Moger was drafted 176th overall by the Vancouver Canucks in the 1989 NHL Entry Draft, but never managed to play a game for them. In five NHL seasons, Moger scored 79 points (41 goals and 38 assists) in 236 regular season games, picking up 212 penalty minutes in the process. He also played in seasons between 2001 and 2007 in Europe.

Moger is notable for having scored the first goal at Boston's FleetCenter (now known as the TD Garden) during a game against the New York Islanders on October 7, 1995.

Career statistics

Awards and honours

References

External links

1969 births
Living people
Ässät players
Boston Bruins players
Canadian ice hockey right wingers
Hamilton Canucks players
HC Pustertal Wölfe players
HIFK (ice hockey) players
Houston Aeros (1994–2013) players
Ice hockey people from British Columbia
Krefeld Pinguine players
Lake Superior State Lakers men's ice hockey players
Los Angeles Kings players
People from the Cariboo Regional District
Providence Bruins players
Schwenninger Wild Wings players
Vancouver Canucks draft picks
Vernon Lakers players
Yorkton Terriers players
NCAA men's ice hockey national champions